All Hail Urusei Yatsura is the debut Urusei Yatsura record, released in 1994.

Track listing
 It Is
 Death 2 Everyone
 Yeah
 Saturn
 On Your Mind
 Teenage Dream Proved Fucked & Wrong

References

1994 EPs
Urusei Yatsura (band) albums